Anand Chandra Joshi (1908-1973) was an Indian politician elected to the Lok Sabha, lower house of the Parliament of India from Sidhi, Madhya Pradesh as a member of the Indian National Congress.

References

External links
 Official biographical sketch in Parliament of India website

1908 births
1973 deaths
India MPs 1952–1957
India MPs 1957–1962
India MPs 1962–1967
Lok Sabha members from Madhya Pradesh
Indian National Congress politicians
Indian National Congress politicians from Madhya Pradesh